Boulder Ridge is a  elevation mountain ridge located in the eastern Olympic Mountains in Jefferson County of Washington state. It is set within Buckhorn Wilderness on land managed by the Olympic National Forest. Its nearest higher peak is Alphabet Ridge,  to the south, and Buckhorn Mountain rises  to the north. Precipitation runoff from Boulder Ridge drains east into headwaters of the Big Quilcene River, west into tributaries of Dungeness River, and south into Charlia Lakes, thence Tunnel Creek.

Climate

Boulder Ridge is located in the marine west coast climate zone of western North America. Most weather fronts originate in the Pacific Ocean, and travel northeast toward the Olympic Mountains. As fronts approach, they are forced upward by the peaks of the Olympic Range, causing them to drop their moisture in the form of rain or snowfall (Orographic lift). As a result, the Olympics experience high precipitation, especially during the winter months in the form of snowfall. During winter months, weather is usually cloudy, but, due to high pressure systems over the Pacific Ocean that intensify during summer months, there is often little or no cloud cover during the summer. Because of maritime influence, snow tends to be wet and heavy, resulting in avalanche danger. The months July through September offer the most favorable weather for viewing or climbing this peak.

Geology

The Olympic Mountains are composed of obducted clastic wedge material and oceanic crust, primarily Eocene sandstone, turbidite, and basaltic oceanic crust. The mountains were sculpted during the Pleistocene era by erosion and glaciers advancing and retreating multiple times.

Gallery

See also

 Geology of the Pacific Northwest
 Geography of Washington (state)

References

External links
 Boulder Ridge at Summitpost.org
 Boulder Ridge: Mountaineers.org
 Weather

Mountains of Washington (state)
Olympic Mountains
Landforms of Jefferson County, Washington